Celeste are a French band from Lyon, founded in 2005. Combining black metal, sludge metal, and post-hardcore, they have released five albums to date.

History 
The band was founded 2005 in the Lyon hardcore punk scene. Guitarist Guillaume Rieth, drummer Antoine Royer, and bassist Antoine Kerbrat had known each other since high school, and recruited vocalist Johan Girardeau. Rieth and Girardeau are former members of the screamo band Mihai Edrisch, which had shared members with Daïtro. Antoine has since left the band, with Girardeau taking up bass and Sébastien Ducotté joining as second guitarist.

In 2006, Celeste released their first EP, followed in 2008 by their debut album, released by German label Denovali Records. Since then, they released four more albums and toured through Europe repeatedly and as far as Russia, Asia, and the US. In June 2021, the band signed to Nuclear Blast.

Style 
The band play a mix of sludge, black metal and post-hardcore, with elements of doom metal and death metal. They refuse other bands as influences.

Members 
Current
Johan Girardeau – vocals (2005–present), bass (2013–present)
Guillaume Rieth – guitar (2005–present)
Antoine Royer – drums (2005–present)
Sébastien Ducotté – guitar (2005–present)

Former
Antoine Kerbrat – bass (2005–2013)

Discography 
 Pessimiste(s) EP (2006)
 Nihiliste(s) (2008)
 Misanthrope(s) (2009)
 Morte(s) Nee(s) (2010)
 Animale(s) (2013)
 Infidèle(s) (2017)
 Assassine(s) (2022)

References

External links 
 Celeste on Bandcamp
 

French black metal musical groups
French hardcore punk groups
Sludge metal musical groups
Post-hardcore groups
Musical groups from Lyon
2005 establishments in France
Musical groups established in 2005
Denovali Records artists